Ronald Powell (27 September 1883 – 22 August 1922) was an Australian cricketer. He played one first-class match for Tasmania in 1914/15.

See also
 List of Tasmanian representative cricketers

References

External links
 

1883 births
1922 deaths
Australian cricketers
Tasmania cricketers
Cricketers from Tasmania